The Bhopal–Gwalior Intercity Express is a superfast inter-city train service which runs between Bhopal Junction railway station of Bhopal City, the capital of Madhya Pradesh and Gwalior Junction railway station in north Madhya Pradesh. The train runs via Bina jn, Guna Jn, Shivpuri. It is the only train which connects Shivpuri to State Capital Bhopal.

Number and nomenclature
The number provided for the train is :
 2197: BHOPAL–GWALIOR–BHOPAL
 2198: GWALIOR–BHOPAL–GWALIOR

The name Intercity refers to a passenger service offered between two important cities.

Coach composite
The train consists of a total of 12 coaches whose classes are:
 5 Second Class Chair Car
 1 AC class chair car
 4 General class car
 1 Handicapped/chair car for physically challenged or SLR 
 1  luggage cum parcel van car or SLR 
This is a new update as per 8 November 2021.
Rake information:-
SLR1
D1
D2
D3
D4
D5
C1
GS
GS
GS
GS
SLR2
The total 12 couches/car

Average speed and frequency
The train runs with an average speed of 61 km/hour.
It runs on Mon.,Tue.,Thu., Fri. and Sat. from both the cities.

Route and halts
The train stops only at 9 halts between Bhopal and Gwalior which include :

 Bhopal Junction
 Vidisha
Ganj Basoda
 Bina Junction
Mungaoli
 Ashoknagar
 Guna Junction
Badarwas
Kolaras
 Shivpuri
 Gwalior Junction

Trivia
 This train is the only Intercity Express train service on Bhopal–Bina–Guna-Shivpuri route.
 It is the first Super Fast Intercity Express of Madhya Pradesh while other Intercity are Express only. But it not runs Fast and can be stopped for passenger train, freight train passing.
 The only intercity express in India which runs five days a week while other runs on daily basis. It should be run on daily basis.

External links
 Bhopal Intercity Express Timings

References
 
 

Express trains in India
Transport in Bhopal
Transport in Gwalior
Rail transport in Madhya Pradesh
Intercity Express (Indian Railways) trains